Aedes alboniveus is a species of mosquito in the genus Aedes. It was described by Philip James Barraud in 1934.

References 

alboniveus
Insects described in 1934